Derlis Ricardo Orué Acevedo (born 2 January 1990 in San Juan Nepomuceno, Paraguay) is a Paraguayan professional footballer who plays as a midfielder for Independiente Campo Grande in the Paraguayan División Intermedia.

Honours
Nacional
 Paraguayan Primera División Torneo Apertura: 2011

References

External links
 
 

Living people
1990 births
Association football midfielders
Paraguayan footballers
Paraguay international footballers
Paraguayan Primera División players
General Díaz footballers
12 de Octubre Football Club players
Club Olimpia footballers
Club Nacional footballers
Club Libertad footballers
Mineros de Zacatecas players
Club Sportivo San Lorenzo footballers